Dadeh Beyglu (also Romanized as Dadeh Beyglū) is a village in Qarah Su Rural District of Meshgin-e Sharqi District, Meshgin Shahr County, Ardabil province, Iran. At the 2006 census, its population was 873 in 229 households. The following census in 2011 counted 829 people in 256 households. The latest census in 2016 showed a population of 662 people in 236 households; it was the largest village in its rural district.

References 

Meshgin Shahr County

Towns and villages in Meshgin Shahr County

Populated places in Ardabil Province

Populated places in Meshgin Shahr County